Adersia oestroides is a species of horse flies in the family Tabanidae.

Distribution
East & Southern Africa, including Zanzibar.

References

Tabanidae
Insects described in 1888
Diptera of Africa
Taxa named by Ferdinand Karsch